MDMP is an American Rock band from Nanakuli, Hawaii, formed in 2017.  Singer, songwriter, multi-instrumentalist, and producer Jeremey Meyer is currently the only permanent member of the band.

History

Formation (2017–2018)

MDMP came to prominence after Meyer's departure from metalcore band Sherry Drive in 2017. MDMP was initially a side project started with Ratzburg & Meyer in the beginning of 2017. On July 1, 2018, the two released a demo version of the song "Coffee." Fans of Meyer reacted with great positivity to the song and what it meant to them.

Day One (2018–2021)
MDMP’s monumental and exhaustively ambitious debut album Day One, came out Aug. 28, 2021 with 27 — tracks that cover a cornucopia of sounds and styles. Arena-sized alt-rock anthems, bruised post-grunge rockers, brooding nu-metal ballads, pounding Sunset Strip glam-slam, energized electro-rock excursions, lush synthesizer ballads, even dashes of reggae-pop, funk and disco.

Musical style and influences

MDMP is a blend of 90s alternative rock, modern adult rock, and electronic rock.  Meyer, the front man, is said to be a Trent Reznor-type with visionary ideas and the drive needed to bring them into the physical world. Bands of heavy influence are Foo Fighters, Alice In Chains, & Nine Inch Nails.

Members

Current
 Jeremey Meyer – lead vocals, guitars, backing vocals, bass, drums, synths

Guest Musicians
 Anu Ratzburg 
 Anton Suchkov
 EJ King 
 Chris Sione
 Shayley Dayshell Bourget

Awards

MDMP has achieved a #1 ranking for the Hawaii area 2017–2021 on Reverb Nation.

Discography

Studio albums
Day One (2021)

Singles

References

External links
Official Site

Musical groups from Hawaii